The 1997 Belarusian Premier League was the seventh season of top-tier football in Belarus.  It started on April 11 and ended on November 11, 1997. MPKC Mozyr were the defending champions.

Team changes from 1996 season
Obuvshchik Lida and Vedrich Rechytsa, placed 15th and 16th respectively, relegated to the First League. They were replaced by two newcomers: 1996 First League winners Transmash Mogilev and runners-up Kommunalnik Slonim. Ataka-Aura Minsk shortened their name to Ataka Minsk

Overview
Dinamo Minsk won their 6th champions title and qualified for the next season's Champions League. The championship runners-up Belshina Bobruisk qualified for UEFA Cup. Bronze medalists and 1997–98 Cup winners Lokomotiv-96 Vitebsk qualified for the Cup Winners' Cup. Originally Torpedo-Kadino Mogilev and Shakhtyor Soligorsk, placed 15th and 16th respectively, were supposed to be relegated to the First League. However, after Ataka Minsk withdrew from Premier League due to bad financial state and two Mogilev teams Dnepr and Transmash merged to form FC Dnepr-Transmash Mogilev, both Shakhtyor and Torpedo-Kadino were allowed to stay in the Premier League.

Teams and venues

Table

Results

Belarusian clubs in European Cups

Top scorers

See also
1997 Belarusian First League
1996–97 Belarusian Cup
1997–98 Belarusian Cup

External links
RSSSF

Belarusian Premier League seasons
1
Belarus
Belarus